The 1978 Swedish speedway season was the 1978 season of motorcycle speedway in Sweden.

Individual

Individual Championship
The 1978 Swedish Individual Speedway Championship final was held on 26 August in Eskilstuna. Anders Michanek won the Swedish Championship for the fourth time.

Junior Championship
 
Winner - Lennart Bengtsson

Team

Team Championship
Getingarna won division 1 and were declared the winners of the Swedish Speedway Team Championship for the ninth time. The team included the riders Anders Michanek, Tommy Nilsson and Richard Hellsén.

The team name for Stjärnorna (The Stars) was changed to Rospiggarna.

Lejonen won the second division, while Pilarna and Filbyterna won the third division north and south respectively.

See also 
 Speedway in Sweden

References

Speedway leagues
Professional sports leagues in Sweden
Swedish
Seasons in Swedish speedway